The Enchanted Mesa Trading Post at 9612 Central Ave. SE. in Albuquerque, New Mexico was built in 1948.  It was a work of Margarete Chase and it was a work of a John Hill.  It was listed on the New Mexico State Register of Cultural Properties in 1997 and the National Register of Historic Places in 1998.

Some portion of it was available for rent, in 2010.

See also
Silver City Water Works Building, Silver City, New Mexico, also NRHP-listed and a work of a John Hill, though dating from 1886

References

External links

Commercial buildings on the National Register of Historic Places in New Mexico
Mission Revival architecture in New Mexico
Traditional Native American dwellings
Commercial buildings completed in 1948
Commercial buildings in Albuquerque, New Mexico
Trading posts in the United States
National Register of Historic Places in Albuquerque, New Mexico
Pueblo Revival architecture in Albuquerque, New Mexico
New Mexico State Register of Cultural Properties